Packs Branch is a stream in the U.S. state of West Virginia.

Packs Branch was named after a local early settler.

See also
List of rivers of West Virginia

References

Rivers of Fayette County, West Virginia
Rivers of West Virginia